Tomorrow is a 2018 British drama film directed by Martha Pinson, written by Stuart Brennan and Sebastian Street, and starring Sebastian Street, Stuart Brennan, Stephen Fry, Sophie Kennedy Clark, James Cosmo, Paul Kaye, Stephanie Leonidas and Joss Stone. Its plot concerns the difficulties faced by soldiers returning home from war. It is the directorial debut of Pinson, a long-time script supervisor to Martin Scorsese. Filming began on 22 September 2014 in London and shot for nine weeks, then moved to Spain, for a further week.

Premise 
The story deals with love, life and living in London. Focusing on a soldier returning home from war with post-traumatic stress disorder, his enigmatic new friend and their difficulties in trying to live normal lives.

Cast 
 Sebastian Street as Tesla
 Stuart Brennan as Sky
 Stephen Fry as Chris
 Sophie Kennedy Clark as Lee-Anne
 James Cosmo as Mr. Charles
 Paul Kaye as Milo
 Stephanie Leonidas as Katie
 Joss Stone as Mandy

Production 

On 25 January 2014 it was announced that Martin Scorsese will be executive producing the film Tomorrow, a directorial debut by his long-time script supervisor, Martha Pinson. Pinson worked with Scorsese on The Departed (2006) and Shutter Island (2010). Lead producer is Stuart Brennan who employed Dean M. Woodford, a 2011 college graduate whose low-budget production Soft Touch impressed Stuart Brennan, who had just finished the script for Tomorrow. On 11 November, Ismael Issa's Rodaje a la carta boarded to assist in the filming of the scenes in Spain.

On 22 September the complete cast was announced, which includes Stephen Fry, Sophie Kennedy Clark, Paul Kaye, Stephanie Leonidas, Joss Stone, Stuart Brennan and Sebastian Street. On 17 October James Cosmo joined the film. 
Brennan & Street are producing the film along with Stronghold, Roaring Mouse Productions and Studio 82.

Principal photography on the film began on 22 September 2014 in London. Filming is expected to last for nine weeks. On 23 September filming was taking place in Battersea; some of the shooting was also taking place at Tedworth House, a recovery centre for war veterans of the armed forces in Wiltshire. Filming later moved in Shoreditch, and then in Spain to shoot near Sierra de Callosa mountain range.

Release 
The UK Trailer was announced exclusively on the Independent website with a release date stated of 27 September 2019. The movie is being distributed in the UK by Stronghold.

References

External links 
 

2018 films
British war drama films
2018 war drama films
Films about war crimes
Films shot in London
Films set in London
2018 drama films
2010s English-language films
2010s British films